The Johnson Barn is a historic barn in rural Washington County, Arkansas, southwest of the city of Fayetteville.  It is located in an agricultural area north of County Road 202 and west of Arkansas Highway 265 (Cato Springs Road).  The barn was designed by Benjamin F. Johnson III, who had studied landscape architecture at Harvard University, and was designed after studying barns throughout the region to accumulate best practices in barn design into a single structure.  The barn was built in 1933 and used by the family until the 1970s.  Notable features include its comparatively large size, hinged loft doors, separate cattle entrances, truss-supported roof, hay hood, and lack of interior supports.

The barn was listed on the National Register of Historic Places in 1990.

See also
National Register of Historic Places listings in Washington County, Arkansas

References

Barns on the National Register of Historic Places in Arkansas
National Register of Historic Places in Washington County, Arkansas
Barns with hay hoods
Individually listed contributing properties to historic districts on the National Register in Arkansas
1933 establishments in Arkansas
Buildings and structures completed in 1933